Paraponera dieteri is an extinct species of Miocene ant in the genus Paraponera. The fossils of the species were found in the Dominican amber and were described by Baroni Urbani in 1994. The fossils are now in the collection of the State Museum of Natural History Stuttgart.

The fact it was found in Dominican Republic suggests that this species belonged to the tropical area.

Etymology
The species is named after Dieter Schlee who was responsible for the buildup of Dominican amber collection at the Stuttgart Museum.

References

Paraponerinae
Miocene insects
Hymenoptera of North America
Fossil ant taxa
Fossil taxa described in 1994